General Ketcham may refer to:

Daniel Warren Ketcham (1867–1935), U.S. Army brigadier general
John H. Ketcham (1832–1906), Union Army brigadier general and brevet major general

See also
William Scott Ketchum (1813–1871), Union Army brigadier general of Volunteers